Turning the Tables: Restaurants and the Rise of the American Middle Class, 1880–1920 is a 2011 book by Andrew P. Haley, an assistant professor of American cultural history at the University of Southern Mississippi.

Awards
Turning the Tables won the 2012 James Beard Award in the Reference and Scholarship category. It was also a finalist for the 2012 International Association of Culinary Professionals Book Award in Culinary History.

References

2011 non-fiction books
Books about economic history
Books about food and drink
English-language books
University of North Carolina Press books